Pakistan Express is a passenger train operated daily by Pakistan Railways between Karachi and Rawalpindi.

History
The train was inaugurated on 16 December 2006 by the Prime Minister Shaukat Aziz at Rawalpindi railway station.

Route
 Karachi Cantonment–Khanewal Junction via Karachi–Peshawar Railway Line
 Khanewal Junction–Wazirabad Junction via Khanewal–Wazirabad Branch Line
 Wazirabad Junction–Rawalpindi via Karachi–Peshawar Railway Line

Station stops

Equipment
The train offers economy class service only.

References

Named passenger trains of Pakistan
Passenger trains in Pakistan
Railway services introduced in 2006